The Special Committee on Peacekeeping Operations of the United Nations, or C34, is a committee of the United Nations General Assembly. It focuses issues relating to peacekeeping.

History 
The Special Committee was created on 18 February 1965 by Resolution 2006 (XIX). It was mandated to conduct a comprehensive review of all issues relating to United Nations peacekeeping.

Each year the General Assembly extends in mandate and calls for it to consider any new proposals that work to enhance the capacity
of the United Nations to fulfill its responsibilities in the field of peacekeeping.

Working methods 
The Committee typically holds a substantive session in New York beginning in February and ending in March. At this session it reviews progress on its previous proposals, as well as consider new efforts to increase the capacity of the United Nations' peacekeeping operations. At the end of the session the Committee provides policy recommendations through its Report of the Special Committee on Peacekeeping Operations.

The Committee reports to the General Assembly on its work through the Fourth Committee (Special Political and Decolonization).

Membership 

The membership of the Committee is split between full members and observers. The full members are mostly past or current contributors to peacekeeping operations.

Full members

Observers

Bureau 
The following make up the bureau of the Special Committee for the 73rd Session of the General Assembly:

References

External links 

United Nations General Assembly subsidiary organs
Military and civilian missions of the European Union